John C. Weaver is a Canadian historian, currently Distinguished University Professor at McMaster University.

References

Year of birth missing (living people)
Living people
Academic staff of McMaster University
21st-century Canadian historians
Place of birth missing (living people)